Mahatma Gandhi Road, commonly referred to by the abbreviation MG Road, is a station on the Purple Line of the Namma Metro in Bangalore, India. It was constructed by Punj Lloyd and opened to the public on 20 October 2011. The station MG Road has a bicycle stand next to the Urban Square, from where commuters can rent cycles. This metro station will serve as Namma Metro's 2nd interchange station after Majestic metro station for the upcoming Pink Line.

History

Boulevard
The old MG Road boulevard was demolished to build Namma Metro. The reconstruction work was contracted to Rajiv Gandhi Rural Housing Corporation and Karnataka Land Army Corporation. The deadline for completion was fixed as March 2012. However, the work was delayed when the ground was found to be unstable and had to be reinforced.

The new boulevard cost  and portions of it were inaugurated on 5 September 2012. It spreads across 850 square metres.

Further plans include a two-tier walkway with a museum, art gallery, amphitheatre and children's play area located on the ground floor. The first floor of the walkway will lead to the first floor/concourse of the metro station and both floors will be equipped with internationally designed toilets. The area where the dummy coach is parked will have ramps leading up to the boulevard.

Gandhi Centre
BMRCL plans to open an exhibition of the life of Mahatma Gandhi on one floor of the station. It was scheduled to open in 2013.

Station layout 

Purple Line Station Layout

Pink Line Station Layout - To Be Confirmed

Entry/Exits

In popular culture
The introduction scene of Adah Sharma in 2015 Kannada film Rana Vikrama was shot at MG Road Metro railway station.

Facilities
ATM of several banks have been installed at Mahatma Gandhi Road metro station.
 ICICI Bank
 HDFC Bank

See also

References

External links

 Bangalore Metro Rail Corporation Ltd. (Official site) 
 UrbanRail.Net – descriptions of all metro systems in the world, each with a schematic map showing all stations.

Namma Metro stations
Railway stations in India opened in 2011
2011 establishments in Karnataka